Amanda Ruter Dufour  (Ruter; February 26, 1822 – May 29, 1899) was a 19th-century American poet. Many of her productions were devotional in nature, and included piety and charity, these being traits she probably inherited from her father. Many of her fugitive pieces were published by the Louisville Journal, the Odd Fellows' Ark, at Columbus, Ohio, and other periodicals. She died in 1899.

Early life and education
Amanda Louise Ruter was born in Jeffersonville, Indiana, February 26, 1822. She was the oldest daughter of Rev. Calvin Washington Ruter, one of the pioneers of Methodism in Indiana. With his brother, the Rev. Dr. Martin Ruter, the two men were among the most highly educated and eminent ministers of the Methodist Church, who, at an early day, brought the foundations of that religion to the valley of the Mississippi River. Her mother was Harriet De Haas Ruter. The father was of Vermont and Puritans ancestry, and the mother was of Virginia and Huguenots ancestry.  One of her siblings was the writer, Rebecca Ruter Springer.

The years of her earliest childhood were spent on a farm near Lexington, Indiana. Ruter enjoyed spending time by herself in a rustic bower constructed in a woodland pasture adjacent to her home. There, rhymes came to her even before she could read. When she was eight years of age, the family removed to New Albany, Indiana where her youth was passed.

Conflicting circumstances influenced her character. On the one hand her father, a man of melancholy temperament and studious habits, required absolute quiet in his household; and this gave the child many hours for lonely reflection and for the study of books. She began to commit her own thoughts to paper, and these usually assumed a poetical form. She possessed herself of some elementary Latin works from her father's library, and sought to teach herself that language. But her mother's health failing, so that many of the domestic duties devolved on her child, she was forced to stay away from books and writing materials, lest the household chores should be neglected.

After Dufour was sent to school, her health declined. She persevered, however, until she had acquired all that her teachers could communicate, and had herself mastered the usual qualifications of a teacher. As her father's parishioners were poor and his financial means were limited, she subsequently assisted by keeping school at Rising Sun, Indiana, in order to aid her parents and to procure, for herself, the means of purchasing the books she craved.

Career
Dufour had an early and earnest desire to travel; to witness, in other lands, the scenes and wonders of which she had read; and there to gather that varied knowledge and experience which at home, except through reading, was beyond our reach. But her wishes were not destined to be gratified. She grew up to adult age without having once left her native State.

In 1842, she married Oliver Dufour, then of New Albany, Indiana, but formerly of Vevay, Indiana. Her husband was the son of John Francis Dufour, from Montreux near Vevey, Switzerland. This gentleman came to the West in 1801, when it was all a wilderness. In 1809, he settled on the spot where Vevay (Indiana) now stands, then a dense, unbroken forest; and he laid out the town in 1813, calling it after his beautiful native place, on the Leman Lake. He was the first settler west of the mountains who ever made wine. He sent a sample of the first vintage to Thomas Jefferson, then President. It so happened that about the same time, someone had sent to the President a bottle of water from the Mississippi River. The water and wine, both from the Western wilderness, were united, and were drank together.

Oliver Dufour was elected to the Indiana Legislature in 1853. He was a prominent member of the Independent Order of Odd Fellows, having been Grand Master of the State of Indiana, Grand Representative from that State and also from the District of Columbia for eight consecutive years. He died in November, 1891.

In 1854, he received from President Franklin Pierce an appointment in the General Land Office,in Washington, D.C., to which place he removed with his family. Until the removal to Washington, consequent upon this appointment, Amanda Dufour had remained a resident of Indiana. She was, therefore, a woman of the West, by birth, by education, by marriage, and by residence, and her poetical talents were exclusively of Western culture. Still, under every discouragement, she wrote, "Out of the fullness of the heart the mouth speaketh." 

Dufour composed verses from a young age. Her peculiarly sensitive temperament long kept her talents from being appreciated. Having no confidence in her own abilities, she shrank from criticism. She was fond of writing for children, and published many poems adapted to their comprehension. In 1848, Hon. Joseph A. Wright, then governor of the State, sent from Indiana, for the Washington monument, a block of marble, on which was inscribed the motto: "No North, No South, Nothing but the Union." This incident suggested to Dufour her poem entitled "The Ark of the Union." It was first published in the Washington Union, and was afterward, without her knowledge, set to music. Some months before the death of the scientist, Baron Von Humboldt, Mrs. Dufour wrote a poem on his distinction as "King of Science." She contributed to the Ladies' Repository, the Masonic Review, the School Day Visitor, the Republican, of Springfield, Ohio, the Louisville Journal, whose editor was the author and poet, George D. Prentice, and the Louisville Democrat. Contemporaries in time and similar in style and sentiment expressed were Julia Louisa Dumont and Mary Louisa Chitwood.

In later years, owing chiefly to ill health, she was less conspicuous in the literary world. Dufour died in Washington, D.C., May 29, 1899, and was buried at that city's Rock Creek Cemetery.

Style and themes
Many of her productions were of a devotional character, mingled with piety and charity, which she may have inherited from her father. Her lines on "Thought," fraught with genuine feeling and characterized by graceful imagery, were from an elaborate poem unpublished. A wild tone of sadness runs through many of this author's pieces, whether, like her piety, a paternal inheritance, or whether born of sad experiences of the world that so often tell upon a sensitive and poetic nature  can only be conjectured. But there was nothing, however, of idle and sickly sentimentality in this strain of sadness; its breath came from a heart strengthened by hope and courage, for all the duties of life.

Her lines entitled "Confession" might alone establish Mrs. Dufour's title to the inborn poetic temperament. There was no true poet who, in moments of inspiration, had not embodied and addressed the ideal. And there was no better test of the depth and purity of the poetic vein than the tone and manner of such an address. Its impassioned lines were wont to disclose all that was noblest at once and warmest, in the inner heart of the writer; and in them, therefore, the reader sought, with best chance of obtaining a clue to the just appreciation of the character, and just estimate of the genius which thus conceived and pictured, not what is, but what might be; not what could be found in this world, but still, what could be imagine, and may hope, perhaps, to meet with in another.

References

Attribution

External links
 
 

1822 births
1899 deaths
19th-century American poets
19th-century American women writers
American women poets
Poets from Indiana
Wikipedia articles incorporating text from A Woman of the Century
Burials at Rock Creek Cemetery